Mount Harkin is a  mountain summit located in the Kootenay River Valley along the eastern border of Kootenay National Park. Park visitors can see the peak from Highway 93, also known as the Banff–Windermere Highway. It is part of the Mitchell Range, which is a sub-range of the Canadian Rockies of British Columbia, Canada. Its nearest higher peak is Mount Assiniboine,  to the northeast.


History
The mountain was named in 1923 by Morrison P. Bridgland in honor of James Bernard Harkin (1875–1955), who was Canada's first National Parks commissioner from 1911 until 1936. Harkin established 11 new national parks and has been called the "Father of the National Parks of Canada." The mountain's name was officially adopted in 1924 by the Geographical Names Board of Canada. Bridgland (1878–1948) was a Dominion Land Surveyor who named many peaks in the Canadian Rockies.

Geology
Mount Harkin is composed principally of Ottertail limestone, a sedimentary rock laid down during the Precambrian to Cambrian periods and pushed east and over the top of younger rock during the Laramide orogeny.

Climate
Based on the Köppen climate classification, Mount Harkin is located in a subarctic climate zone with cold, snowy winters, and mild summers. Winter temperatures can drop below −20 °C with wind chill factors below −30 °C. Precipitation runoff from the mountain drains east into tributaries of the Cross River, or directly west to the Kootenay River.

See also
Geology of the Rocky Mountains
Geography of British Columbia

References

External links
 Mount Harkin weather forecast
 Parks Canada web site: Kootenay National Park

Two-thousanders of British Columbia
Canadian Rockies
Kootenay Land District